Luke Jackson (born 19 June 1994) is a British singer-songwriter from Canterbury. He started playing guitar when he was ten, and made his first public performance at his primary school's leaving assembly He recorded his first album More than Boys, produced by Martyn Joseph, when he was 18.

He has been nominated for the BBC Radio 2 Young Folk Award and the BBC Radio 2 Folk Awards "Horizon Award" for best emerging talent. He received a career development bursary from Help Musicians UK.

Jackson has toured extensively, including four tours with Amy Wadge who co-wrote songs on Jackson's first EP Songs I Wrote With Amy. Jackson has also toured with Ed Sheeran and Marillion.

Discography 
More than Boys (2012)
 Fumes and Faith (2014)
Tall Tales and Rumours (2016)
Solo | Duo | Trio (live) (2018)
Journals (2019)

Compilation
 PQ47, Free CD for The Passport Q members, 2012.
 Run and Hide
 With Martyn Joseph: PQ50, Free CD for The Passport Q members, 2013.
 Roads
 Bakers Woods

Awards 
 Horizon Award for Best Emerging Talent (2013) (finalists)
 BBC Radio 2 Young Folk Award (2013) (finalist)
 Fatea Male Artist of the Year (2014)
 Fatea Male Artist of the Year (2016)
Fatea Album of the Year  - Journals (2020)

References 

 Jackson, Luke, "Martyn's Autumn Tour, 2012", The Passport Q, The Official Blurb on Martyn Joseph, Issue 50, March 2013, p10.

External links 
 Personal Website

1994 births
Living people
People from Canterbury
English male singer-songwriters